This aims to be a complete list of DVD manufacturers.

This list may not be complete or up to date. If you see a manufacturer that should be here but isn't (or one that shouldn't be here but is), please update the page accordingly.  This list is only a list of brand names for DVDs and not an actual
manufacturers list.

A
 Aiwa
 Akai
 Alba
 Amazon
 Amstrad
 Apex Digital
 Apple
 ACCURA
 Acme
 Acer
 Allied Electronics Pte Limited
 Asus

B
 Bang & Olufsen
 BenQ
 Bose
 Bush
 Beyond

C
 CMC Magnetics
 Citizen Electronics Co., Ltd.
 Craig Electronics
 Curtis International Ltd.

D
 Daewoo Electronics
 Denon
 Dell

E
 Emerson

F 
 Facebook
 Funai
 Fukuda

G
 GE
 Google
 Go Electronics
 Grundig

H
 Harman/kardon
 Hitachi
 Hewlett-Packard

I
 Imation

J
 Jodie
 JVC

K
 KDS

L
 Lenovo
 LG
 LiteOn
 Loewe

M
 Magnavox
 Marantz
 Maxell
 Medion
 Memorex
 Microsoft Windows
 Mitsubishi Electric
 Moser Baer
 Mustek Systems, Inc.

N
 NEC

O
 Onn
 Oppo
 Orion Electric

P
 Panasonic
 Philips
 Pioneer
 ProScan
 Pressing-Media

R
 RCA
 Ritek
 Ricoh

S
 Samsung
 Sanyo
 Sharp
 Sony
 Sylvania
 Symphonic
 SM Pictures

T
 Teac
 Technics
 Technika
 Thomson
 Toshiba

U

V
 Verbatim Corporation

W
 Weltec

Y
 Yamaha

Z
 Zenith

See also
 DVD

References

 

Computing-related lists
Technology-related lists
DVD